Little Odessa is a 1994 American crime drama film written and directed by James Gray, in his directorial debut, and starring Tim Roth, Edward Furlong, Moira Kelly, Maximilian Schell and Vanessa Redgrave. The title is a reference to Brighton Beach, a community in Brooklyn nicknamed "Little Odessa".

Plot
The film follows the personal relationship between Arkady Shapira, his terminally ill wife Irina, and their two sons, Joshua and Reuben. Joshua, the elder brother, is a hit-man for the Russian-Jewish mafia in Brooklyn and estranged from his family. After finishing a contract killing, Joshua is ordered to kill an Iranian jeweler in Brighton Beach, which he reluctantly accepts. Joshua stands outside his family's apartment, where he is spotted by one of his old friends Sasha, who tells Joshua's brother Reuben the next day. Reuben goes to the hotel where Joshua is staying to see him. Joshua asks Reuben how he knew he was in Brighton, and they plan to meet again the next day.

Joshua waits near the boardwalk where Sasha is and intimidates him to tell who else knows about Joshua being in Brighton. Sasha brings Joshua to the car repair
stand where Viktor and Yuri are. Joshua says they will help him find the Iranian jeweler and when they refuse, Joshua threatens them.

When a man notices Joshua walking on the street, Joshua follows him to a phone booth and shoots him dead to avoid being exposed, angering neighborhood boss Boris Volkoff. Joshua starts dating his ex-girlfriend Alla Shustervich, who asks Reuben if he has seen Joshua anywhere, and the trio see a movie together. Eventually, Reuben takes Joshua home to see his parents again, but Arkady denounces him as a murderer and kicks him out.

Joshua uses information about his father's affair to see his dying mother, who, after reminiscing about the past, asks him to go to his grandmother's birthday party, which Joshua agrees to. On the day of the party, Joshua meets with his friends to kidnap the jeweler. They take him to the dump where Joshua kills the man, before burning the body in the furnace. They wipe the gun clean of prints and drop it near the furnace. Reuben witnesses the killing, and takes the gun from the murder scene. Arkady discovers that Reuben has been skipping school for two months and beats him. Upon seeing Reuben's bruised face, Joshua brings Arkady to a snowy field and prepares to kill him, but loses his nerve after Arkady tells him that there's nowhere left for him to go in Brighton Beach. Afterwards, Arkady relinquishes his son to Volkoff and Irina dies.

The next day when Reuben is riding his bike, two of Volkoff's men push him to the ground and tell him that Joshua is a dead man. With the mafia pursuing him, Joshua stays at Alla's.

Volkoff's men look for Joshua and search Alla's neighborhood. Reuben finds out from Sasha where Joshua is and rides there on his bike to warn his brother. One of Volkoff's men finds Alla outside hanging out laundry and shoots her before escaping. Reuben finds Alla's body and shoots the second would-be assassin. Sasha arrives on the spot and, seeing somebody behind the sheets that Alla had hung out to dry, immediately shoots the person through the sheet, believing it is one of the men looking for Joshua. When he looks behind the sheet, he realizes that he has killed Reuben; he runs off before Joshua can show up. Afterwards, Joshua finds Reuben and takes his body, wrapped in the sheet, to the furnace for cremation.

Cast

Reception
The film earned a Silver Lion at the Venice Film Festival and the prestigious Grand Prix of the Belgian Film Critics Association. It also earned admiration from French New Wave filmmaker Claude Chabrol. 

It was nominated for five Independent Spirit Awards.

On Rotten Tomatoes, Little Odessa holds a rating of 53% from 19 reviews.

References

External links

1994 films
1994 crime drama films
American crime drama films
American coming-of-age drama films
American independent films
Films directed by James Gray
Films set in Brooklyn
Films about the Russian Mafia
Films about Jewish-American organized crime
Russian-Jewish culture in New York City
Films with screenplays by James Gray
1994 directorial debut films
1994 independent films
1990s English-language films
Brighton Beach
Films about dysfunctional families
Films about brothers
1990s American films